William E. Williams, also known as El Da Sensei is an American rapper from Newark, New Jersey. During the 1990s he was a member of the hip hop duo, Artifacts.

Since then he has released several solo albums.

In 2015, at The 14th Annual Independent Music Awards, "The Immortals Project Featuring El Da Sensei" won the award in the "Rap/Hip-Hop - Song" category for "On the Rise".

Discography

With Artifacts 

 1994: Between a Rock and a Hard Place
 1997: That's Them

Solo 

2003: Relax, Relate, Release (Seven Heads)
2006: The Unusual (Fat Beats)
2008: Unheard Of
2008: Global Takeover: The Beginning (with Polish hip hop duo The Returners (Little & DJ Chwiał))
2009: The Money EP (with The Returners)
2009: Shining Shadow Presents... The Immortals Project
2010: GT2: Nu World (with The Returners)
2011: The Nu World Remix EP
2013: The Immortals Project Feat. El Da Sensei - Rogue Agents (Shining Shadow)
2017: We Bring It Live 1/3 of the 'n Chillow series (with Chillowproductions)
2018: XL (with Sadat X)
2021 Solving Cases (with Jake Palumbo)

References

Living people
African-American male rappers
Rappers from Newark, New Jersey
1971 births
21st-century American rappers
21st-century American male musicians
21st-century African-American musicians
20th-century African-American people